Abu Ahsan Mohammad Shamsul Arefin Siddique (born 26 October 1953) is a Bangladeshi academic who served as the 27th vice-chancellor of the University of Dhaka during 2009–2017. On 15 July 2020, he was appointed  as the chairman of the board of directors of Bangladesh Sangbad Sangstha (BSS).

Early life and education
Siddique was born in Dhaka. He completed his BA and MA degree from Dhaka College when it was an affiliated college under the University of Dhaka.  Then he moved to the University of Dhaka and obtained Master of Arts in mass communication and journalism degree in 1975. He earned his PhD degree in televised teaching in 1985 from the University of Mysore in India.

References

1953 births
Living people
Dhaka College alumni
University of Dhaka alumni
Academic staff of the University of Dhaka
University of Mysore alumni
Vice-Chancellors of the University of Dhaka